The Mating Call is a 1928  American silent drama film about a soldier who returns home from World War I to find his marriage has been annulled and his wife has remarried. The film was produced by Howard Hughes for his Caddo Corporation, and was originally released by Paramount Pictures. It is based on the novel of the same name by Rex Beach. Renée Adorée has a brief nude scene in the film.

Plot
Leslie Hatton, a poor farmer, becomes a captain and a war hero in World War I. While on a leave, he secretly marries Rose, the "village belle", but he only has time for a few kisses and a hug before he has to return to the fighting. After the Armistice, Major Hatton comes home, only to be told by Marvin Swallow that his wife's parents have had their marriage annulled, as she was not of age. Rose married wealthy Lon Henderson and the couple went abroad. Les returns to farming.

One day, the Hendersons return. Rose, disillusioned by Lon's repeated infidelity, throws herself at Les. He weakens and embraces her, but then Lon shows up. The two men struggle when Lon pulls out a gun. No one is hurt, and Les invents a French wife on her way to the farm so he will be left alone.

He goes to Ellis Island in search of a real wife. An official directs him to Catherine and her parents, poor would-be immigrants who are facing deportation. He offers to marry her in exchange for the family being allowed to settle in America. Her parents strongly oppose the bargain, but she accepts. That night, Catherine is prepared to share her bed with her husband, but sensing her resigned attitude, Les decides at the last minute to sleep alone in another room. They gradually fall in love.

Meanwhile, Lon decides to break off his affair with young Jessie Peebles. When Marvin asks her to marry him, she asks for a little time to consider. Les later finds her lifeless body in a pond on his farm. Lon, a member of the local Ku Klux Klan-like Order, insinuates that Les must have had something to do with Jessie's suicide. Les is taken at gunpoint to face vigilante justice. The head of the Order sends for Lon, but decides in his absence that the evidence is overwhelming, and Les is tied up and whipped. The men sent to fetch Lon find him dead in his office and Marvin hiding with a gun. They take him back to the Order meeting. He denies having killed Lon and produces Lon's love letters to Jessie, exonerating Les. The head of the Order rules that, even if Marvin did not kill Lon, he would have been justified to do so. One of his men stages it to look like suicide. (Judge Peebles, Jessie's father, is shown at home, unloading and cleaning his gun. One cartridge has been discharged.)

Cast
Thomas Meighan as Leslie Hatton
Evelyn Brent as Rose Henderson
Renée Adorée as Catherine
Alan Roscoe as Lon Henderson
Gardner James as Marvin Swallow
Helen Foster as Jessie
Luke Cosgrove as Judge Peebles
Cyril Chadwick as Anderson
Will Walling
Delmer Daves
Frederic Richard Sullivan

Notes
Although the story takes place immediately after World War I (1918-1919), all of Evelyn Brent's and Helen Foster's clothes are strictly in the 1928 short skirt mode, completely out of place in the time frame of the story. The film does reflect, however, some of the societal issues following the war. During the war, women had greater freedom regarding employment and their role in society, and there was pressure after the end of the war for them to return to their pre-war status. 

Principal photography took place in Hollywood, San Diego and Fallbrook, California.

Reception
Adorée received positive reviews for her performance in The Mating Call, even though it differed little from the wide-eyed "Euro-damsels" that were her trademark.

Preservation
This film, long thought to be lost, was discovered in the archives of Howard Hughes at the University of Nevada, Las Vegas. The Mating Call was preserved by the Academy Film Archive, in conjunction with UNLV, in 2016.

References

External links

The Mating Call at Virtual History

American romantic drama films
American silent feature films
American black-and-white films
Films based on American novels
Films directed by James Cruze
Films based on works by Rex Beach
Paramount Pictures films
Films set on the United States home front during World War I
Ku Klux Klan
Films with screenplays by Herman J. Mankiewicz
Films produced by Howard Hughes
1920s rediscovered films
Rediscovered American films
1928 romantic drama films
1920s American films
Silent romantic drama films
Silent war films
Silent American drama films
1920s English-language films
Films shot in San Diego
Films set in San Diego
Films shot in Los Angeles